The London Fire Brigade Museum (temporarily housed at The Workshop, Lambeth High Street) covers the history of firefighting since 1666 (the date of the Great Fire of London). The museum houses old fire appliances and other equipment.

Overview
The museum was located in Winchester House, the former home of Captain Sir Eyre Massey Shaw, who was Superintendent of the Metropolitan Fire Brigade. It was the London Fire Brigade headquarters until 1937 when King George VI opened a new building on the Albert Embankment on the south bank of the River Thames.

The building at Winchester House closed its doors to the public in September 2015 and the collection was audited and put into storage pending the opening of a dedicated new museum.

In July 2015, members of London Fire and Emergency Planning Authority agreed to make the provision of a new museum, as well as a fire station, a condition of the sale and redevelopment of the Brigade's old headquarters on Albert Embankment in Lambeth.

Current status
It is estimated it could be 2023 until the new museum opens but in the meantime there are still opportunities for the public to view the historic collection. These include temporary exhibitions across London, outreach visits and educational talks and lectures and events to commemorate the 150th anniversary celebrations.

Former address
The former address of the museum was:
 London Fire Brigade Museum
 Winchester House
 94A Southwark Bridge Road
 London

References

External links
 Museum website
 Information from the 24 Hour Museum
 Fire Brigade Museum to get a new home
 Museum could move to Albert Embankment
 London SE1 website information

1966 establishments in England
Museums established in 1966
History museums in London
Firefighting museums in England
Museums in the London Borough of Southwark